Synnympha is a genus of moths in the family Gracillariidae.

Species
Synnympha diluviata Meyrick, 1915
Synnympha perfrenis Meyrick, 1920

External links
Global Taxonomic Database of Gracillariidae (Lepidoptera)

Gracillariinae
Gracillarioidea genera